Stefan Erixon (born 1 December 1977) is a former Swedish bandy player.

Career

Club career
Erixon is a youth product of Gamleby and represented their senior team, IFK Motala, Hammarby before joining Zorky in 2007. In December 2008, his contract with Zorky was terminated because of the club's financial problems. Erixon then returned to Hammarby and played there until 2015.

International career
Erixon has played for the Swedish national bandy team making his debut in the 2001–02 season. Erixon was part of Swedish World Champions teams of 2003, 2005, 2009, 2010, 2012

Honours

Country
 Sweden
 Bandy World Championship: 2003, 2005, 2009, 2010, 2012

References

External links
 
 

1977 births
Living people
Swedish bandy players
Expatriate bandy players in Russia
Swedish expatriate sportspeople in Russia
Hammarby IF Bandy players
IFK Motala players
Zorky Krasnogorsk players
Sweden international bandy players
Bandy World Championship-winning players